Professor Helena Sandsmark is a DC Comics character created by writer/artist John Byrne for the Wonder Woman comic book series, first appearing in Wonder Woman (vol. 2) #105. The mother of the second incarnation of Wonder Girl, Cassandra Sandsmark and a distinguished academic in the field of archaeology, Helena is also close friends with her daughter's mentor Wonder Woman.

Fictional character biography

Post-Zero Hour introduction
Helena (and her daughter, Cassie/Wonder Girl) are introduced in the revised DC Universe created after the Zero Hour: Crisis in Time storyline.

Helena studied archeology at Harvard University under Julia Kapatelis, and was one of her brightest students. After graduation, she participated in several digs around the world, including one in Greece, where she made an important discovery that made her famous in her profession. On the merits of her work in Greece and a recommendation from Julia, Helena was awarded a job as curator at the Gateway City Museum of Antiquities, the museum with the largest collection of Greek artifacts outside of Greece. She was the youngest archeologist ever to hold such a position. 

Helena met a man whom she later found out was the Olympian god Zeus. She eventually became pregnant with his demigod child, but he had disappeared from her life by the time she gave birth to Cassie. Helena had raised Cassie alone without revealing the identity of her father or her divine parentage.

Julia sent her friend Wonder Woman to Gateway City, so she could study at the museum. While there, Diana befriended Helena and her daughter. Helena had also entered into a short-lived relationship with Jason Blood, a visiting occultist, though she was unaware of his other side at the time. As Diana attracted more and more attention from enemies, Helena became concerned for her daughter. However, she was surprised when Zeus granted her daughter powers. Her former mate also granted Helena the power to remove Cassie's powers by speaking one word, effectively grounding her when she needed to. When Cassie found out Zeus was her father, the revelation nearly destroyed the relationship between mother and daughter.

Around the time Diana left Gateway City, Helena had finally made amends with Cassie and granted her blessing to continue as Wonder Girl with the understanding that she'd be well trained in combat by Artemis. Helena also supervised her daughter's membership in the superhero team Young Justice but openly objected to the fact that Cissie "Arrowette" Jones-King's mother Bonnie encouraged her daughter's participation without regard to the potential dangers. At one point, Helena even judged Bonnie's behavior to be so dangerous that she kept Cissie with her and Cassie in Gateway City. Helena remained there for Cassie in the troubled months that folflowed, adjusting when Wonder Girl's true identity was publicly revealed by the Silver Swan, mending fences when the teen learned that Zeus was her father, and consoling her daughter after her boyfriend Superboy was killed during the Infinite Crisis.

During the "Amazons Attack" incident, Wonder Girl and Supergirl attempted to negotiate an end to the war between the Amazons and the United States but inadvertently made things worse when the president of the United States was killed. Helena was deemed a collaborator by the US government and sent to an internment camp, leading Cassie to mount an attempted rescue. At her mother's insistence that the situation be settled peacefully, Wonder Girl finally departed.

In the war's wake, Wonder Girl and her mother were viewed with a wary eye. Leaving the Gateway Museum, Helena took a sabbatical in Greece and used the Gauntlet of Atlas and Sandals of Hermes to keep her safe. They proved invaluable when she was abducted by the Female Furies and an ensorcelled Hercules. When the latter attacked Wonder Girl, Helena astonished her daughter by sending the demigod reeling with one punch powered by the godly gauntlet. The adventure also reunited Helena with her old friend Aristides Demetrios, who was known as The Olympian and had protected Helena during the young archaeologist's pregnancy.

Helena later joined fellow archeologists Vijay and Rani Singh for an dig in Mohenjo-Daro, Pakistan. When Vijay and Rani both mysteriously disappeared, Helena called the Teen Titans for help. Upon arriving, the Titans joined Kiran Singh – the brilliantly super-powered Solstice – in the search for her parents. But the team soon found itself trapped in a lost kingdom as they were attacked by the Hindu god King Rankor and his demonic minions. In the most brilliant display of her powers to date, Solstice unleashed a blinding pulse that drove the demons away, liberating Helena and the Singhs from King Rankor's grasp.

The New 52
In The New 52 reboot of DC's continuity, Cassie's father is a British super-soldier named Lennox Sandsmark, who turns out to be Wonder Woman's half-brother and himself a demigod son of Zeus. Lennox left the family when Cassie was only four years old, so Helena (again) raised Cassie alone without revealing the identity of her father or her divine parentage. Teenaged Cassie meets Red Robin, joins the Teen Titans and eventually learns that she is the demigoddess niece of Wonder Woman.

In other media

Television
Dr. Helena Sandsmark appears in Young Justice: Outsiders, voiced by Mae Whitman.

Video games
Dr. Helena Sandsmark appears as a non-playable character (NPC) in Young Justice: Legacy, voiced by Mae Whitman.

Miscellaneous
 Helena Sandsmark appears in the DC Animated Universe (DCAU) tie-in comics Adventures in the DC Universe and DC Comics Presents: Wonder Woman Adventures #1.
 Helena Sandsmark appears in issue #54 of Teen Titans Go!.

Footnotes

Characters created by John Byrne (comics)
DC Comics female characters
DC Comics scientists
Fictional schoolteachers
Fictional Harvard University people
Fictional professors
Fictional archaeologists
Comics characters introduced in 1996
Wonder Woman characters
Fictional female scientists